Patent Shaft, formerly The Patent Shaft and Axletree Company, established in 1840, was a large steelworks situated in Wednesbury, West Midlands, England. It was in operation for 140 years.

From the time of its opening, it employed hundreds of local people and was a key player in the Industrial Revolution that spread across the Black Country during the nineteenth century, and gave the region its iconic name.

A decline in the manufacturing industry during the 1970s meant that even the largest factories were faced with threat of closure. Patent Shaft closed in 1980 after 140 years, resulting in hundreds of job losses. The factory buildings were demolished in 1983.

In the decade following its closure, the Patent Shaft site was substantially transformed. The construction of the Black Country Spine Road between Bilston and West Bromwich opened up several square miles of previously inaccessible land in 1995. The Spine Road actually passed through the Patent Shaft site, and an Automotive Component Park was opened on another part of the site on 2 March 1993. This development - exclusively occupied by car component manufacturers - was the first of its kind in Europe.

The Patent Shaft factory gates still exist, situated on a traffic island in Wednesbury at the junction of Holyhead Road and Dudley Street, having been moved from their original location around 30 years after the factory’s closure.

The archives of Patent Shaft are held at Sandwell Community History and Archives Service.

References

External links
History of Wednesbury, Bev Parker

Patent Shaft Archive Catalogue

Defunct manufacturing companies of the United Kingdom
Wednesbury
Defunct companies based in the West Midlands (county)
Buildings and structures demolished in 1983
Demolished buildings and structures in England